Narendra Bedi (1937–1982) was a Bollywood director and son of the writer Rajinder Singh Bedi. He is most known for hits movies like  Jawani Diwani (1972) starring Randhir Kapoor and Jaya Bhaduri, Rajesh Khanna starrers Bandhan  and Maha Chor ,  and Amitabh Bachchan starrers Benaam (1974) and Adalat (1977) and the comedy film Rafoo Chakkar.

Personal life
Narendra Bedi was the son of famous Urdu writer and screenwriter Rajinder Singh Bedi. He received a degree in Arts from University of Mumbai, and thereafter started his career by joining the film production team of G. P. Sippy, who later produced Bedi's debut film, Bandhan (1969), starring Rajesh Khanna and Mumtaz.

His films were either in romantic comedy genre like that of Jawani Diwani, Dil Diwana, Rafoo Chakkar, Sanam Teri Kasam  or were of action genre like Maha Chor, Khotey Sikkay, and had music by R.D. Burman. His film Sanam Teri Kasam fetched R.D.Burman his very first Filmfare Best Music Director Award. His only flops in his career as directors were Dil Diwana, Kachche Heere and Aakhri Sanghursh.

Filmography
Bandhan (1969)
Jawani Diwani (1972)
Dil Diwana (1974)
Khotey Sikkay (1974)
Benaam (1974)
Rafoo Chakkar (1975)
Maha Chor (1976)
Adalat (1977)
Kachche Heere (1982)
Sanam Teri Kasam (1982)
Aakhri Sanghursh (1997)

References

External links

1937 births
1982 deaths
Hindi-language film directors
Indian male screenwriters
University of Mumbai alumni
Film directors from Mumbai
20th-century Indian film directors
20th-century Indian screenwriters
20th-century Indian male writers